The Hits Chapter 2 is the second greatest hits album released by American country music artist Sammy Kershaw. The counterpart to his 1995 album The Hits Chapter 1, it features eleven of the greatest hits from his fourth through sixth albums. No new material was recorded for this album.

Track listing

References

External links 

 

2001 greatest hits albums
Sammy Kershaw albums
Mercury Records compilation albums